John A. Lane (b. 1955) is an American writer and historian of printing living in the Netherlands. Lane received the 2003 Fellowship of the American Printing History Association and is particularly known for his writing on Dutch printing history and figures including Nicolaes Briot, Christoffel van Dijck and Miklós Kis.

Lane studied physics at Yale University and became interested in printing through working on a printing press at the university. After working in font digitization for Autologic, he moved to Europe. He has written books on the history of printing in Armenian, an edition of the 1768 type specimen showcase of the Enschedé type foundry, and on materials in the collections of the Plantin-Moretus Museum and the University of Amsterdam and worked as a historical consultant for Adobe Systems.

References

External links
 LinkedIn page

Living people
1955 births
Yale University alumni
American emigrants to the Netherlands
Historians of printing
American art historians
Academic staff of the University of Amsterdam